Gundal och Högås is a trimunicipal locality situated in Kungsbacka Municipality, Halland County, and Gothenburg Municipality and Mölndal Municipality in Västra Götaland County, Sweden. It had 384 inhabitants in 2010.

References 

Populated places in Halland County
Populated places in Västra Götaland County
Populated places in Gothenburg Municipality
Populated places in Kungsbacka Municipality
Populated places in Mölndal Municipality